Too Close to Heaven is a collection of outtakes, alternative versions, and unreleased tracks from The Waterboys' Fisherman's Blues period, released September 2001.  The album was released as Fisherman's Blues, Part 2 in the United States with five additional tracks in July of that year.

The title track of the album refers to the myth of Icarus.  Dave Simpson writes in The Guardian, "Quite how Too Close to Heaven – a song that is easily worthy of either John Lennon or Van Morrison - languished in the vaults for 12 years is a matter for Scott's conscience (and his accountants)".  The song has become a favourite at Waterboys concerts.

Track listing
All songs written by Mike Scott, except as noted.

 "On My Way to Heaven"  (Traditional) – 4:01
 "Higher in Time"  (Scott, Anthony Thistlethwaite) – 5:02
 "The Ladder" – 2:58
 "Too Close to Heaven" – 12:29
 "Good Man Gone" – 5:13
 "Blues for Your Baby" – 5:42
 "Custer's Blues" – 5:59
 "A Home in the Meadow" (Sammy Cahn, Alfred Newman) – 3:13
 "Tenderfootin'"  (Trevor Hutchinson, Scott, Thistlethwaite, Steve Wickham, Kevin Wilkinson) – 5:15
 "Lonesome Old Wind" – 8:19

Fisherman's Blues, Part 2 track listing
 "On My Way to Heaven" (Traditional) – 4:01
 "Higher in Time" (Scott, Thistlethwaite) – 5:02
 "The Ladder" – 2:58
 "Too Close to Heaven" – 12:29
 "Good Man Gone" – 5:13
 "Blues for Your Baby" – 5:42
 "Custer's Blues" – 5:59
 "A Home in the Meadow" (Cahn, Newman) – 3:13
 "Tenderfootin'"  (Hutchinson, Scott, Thistlethwaite, Wickham, Kevin Wilkinson) – 5:15
 "Lonesome Old Wind" – 8:19
 "Higher in Time" (Scott, Thistlethwaite) – 3:39
 "Ain't Leaving, I'm Gone" (Scott, Thistlethwaite) – 4:24
 "Lonesome and a Long Way From Home"  (Scott, Thistlethwaite) – 3:20
 "The Good Ship Sirius" (Wickham) – 0:36
 "Too Close to Heaven" (Live) – 13:16

Notes and references

External links
Lyrics at mikescottwaterboys.com
Official forum Chord requests are often fulfilled at "Musician's Corner"

The Waterboys albums
2001 compilation albums